Roads named Albion Road include:

Britain
Albion Road, a Road in London

Canada

Greater Toronto Area
Albion Road (Toronto)
Ontario Highway 50

Elsewhere
Albion Road (Ottawa)

Roads in Toronto
Roads in Ottawa
Roads in London